William "Bill" Holliday (born 4 July 1939) is a former professional rugby league footballer who played in the 1950s, 1960s and 1970s, and coached in the 1980s.

Background
Bill Holliday was born in Whitehaven, Cumberland, England.

Playing career

International honours
Bill Holliday won caps for Great Britain while at Whitehaven in 1964 against France, in 1965 against France, New Zealand (3 matches), while at Hull Kingston Rovers in 1966 against France, France (sub), and in 1967 against Australia (3 matches). Bill Holliday captained Great Britain in 1967 against Australia (3 matches).

County Cup Final appearances
Bill Holliday played left-, i.e. number 11, in Hull Kingston Rovers' 25-12 victory over Featherstone Rovers in the 1966 Yorkshire County Cup Final during the 1966–67 season at Headingley Rugby Stadium, Leeds on Saturday 15 October 1966, played left-, i.e. number 8, in Hull Kingston Rovers' 8-7 victory over Hull F.C. in the 1967 Yorkshire County Cup Final during the 1967–68 season at Headingley Rugby Stadium, Leeds on Saturday 14 October 1967, played left- in Swinton's 11-2 victory over Leigh in the 1969 Lancashire County Cup Final during the 1969–70 season at Central Park, Wigan on Saturday 1 November 1969, and played as an interchange/substitute, i.e. number 15, (replacing  Rod Smith) in the 11-25 defeat by Salford in the 1972 Lancashire County Cup Final during the 1972–73 season at Central Park, Wigan on Saturday 21 October 1972.

Player's No.6 Trophy Final appearances
Bill Holliday played left-, i.e. number 8, and scored 2-conversions in Rochdale Hornets' 16-27 defeat by Warrington in the 1973–74 Player's No.6 Trophy Final during the 1973–74 season at Central Park, Wigan on Saturday 9 February 1974. Holliday had secured the quarter final victory for Rochdale over Leeds with a drop goal from just inside the attacking half to give Hornets a 7 points to 5 lead.

Honoured at Whitehaven
Bill Holliday is a Whitehaven Hall of Fame inductee.

Genealogical information
Bill Holliday is the father of the rugby league footballer; Les Holliday, and the rugby league footballer who played in the 1980s for Swinton and Leigh; Mike Holliday.

References

External links
!Great Britain Statistics at englandrl.co.uk (statistics currently missing due to not having appeared for both Great Britain, and England)
Search for "William Holliday" at britishnewspaperarchive.co.uk
Search for "Bill Holliday" at britishnewspaperarchive.co.uk

1939 births
Living people
English rugby league coaches
English rugby league players
Great Britain national rugby league team captains
Great Britain national rugby league team players
Hull Kingston Rovers players
Rochdale Hornets players
Rugby league players from Whitehaven
Rugby league props
Rugby league second-rows
Swinton Lions coaches
Swinton Lions players
Whitehaven R.L.F.C. players